Woodcroft is a neighbourhood located in northwest Edmonton, Alberta, Canada. Surrounded by a mixture of residential neighbourhoods and light industrial subdivisions, it is bounded by 118 Avenue to the north, Groat Road to the east, 111 Avenue to the south, and 142 Street to the west. The neighbourhoods is home to Coronation Park and the Telus World of Science.

The six residential neighbourhoods adjacent to Woodcroft include Dovercourt to the north, Sherbrooke to the northeast, Inglewood to the east, Westmount to the southeast, North Glenora to the south, and McQueen to the southwest. Huff Bremner Estate and Dominion Industrial are located to the west and northwest.

The community is represented by the Woodcroft Community League, established in 1957, which maintains a community hall and outdoor rink located at 139 Street and 115 Avenue.

Demographics 

Attractions 

Coronation Park is a large park occupying most of the southwest portion of the neighbourhood. The park is anchored by the Telus World of Science, formerly the Edmonton Space and Sciences Centre, at the northeast corner of 111 Avenue and 142 Street. Other attractions within the park include the Queen Elizabeth Planetarium, an ice arena, a small football stadium, a lawn bowling facility and the Peter Hemingway Fitness and Leisure Centre, formerly the Coronation Pool. 

The neighbourhood is also home to the Woodcroft Branch of the Edmonton Public Library.

Shopping 
Westmount Centre, built in 1955, is located in the southeast portion of the neighbourhood at the northwest corner of 111 Avenue and Groat Road. It was the first major shopping mall of its type in Edmonton.

Education 
Located between Coronation Park and the Westmount Centre is Ross Sheppard High School operated by Edmonton Public Schools. Other schools in Woodcroft include Woodcroft Public Elementary School and the St. Mark Catholic School.

Westmount Transit Centre 

The Westmount Transit Centre is located between Ross Sheppard High School and Westmount Centre along 135 street. This transit centre has a large shelter, a pay phone and vending machines but does not have public washrooms, park & ride, or a drop off area. The transit centre is served by Edmonton Transit Service (ETS) and St. Albert Transit (StAT).

The following bus routes serve the transit centre:

See also 
 Edmonton Federation of Community Leagues

References

External links 
 Woodcroft Community Website

Surrounding neighbourhoods 

Neighbourhoods in Edmonton
Edmonton Transit Service transit centres